Marleen is a Dutch-language feminine given name. It can be a contraction of Maria and either Magdalena or Helena. People bearing the name include:

Marleen Barth (born 1964), Dutch politician
Marleen S. Barr (born 1953), American academic and author
Marleen Clemminck (born 1958), Belgian racing cyclist
Marleen Daniels (born 1958), Belgian photographer
Marleen Gorris (born 1948), Dutch writer and director
Marleen van Iersel (born 1988), Dutch beach volleyball player
Marleen Kuppens (born 1959), Belgian sprint canoer
Marleen de Pater-van der Meer (1950–2015), Dutch politician
Marleen Renders (born 1968), Belgian long-distance runner
Marleen van Rij (born 1950), Dutch rower
Marleen Temmerman (born 1953), Belgian politician
Marleen Vanderpoorten (born 1954), Belgian/Flemish politician
Marleen Veldhuis (born 1979), Dutch swimmer
Marleen Wissink (born 1969), Dutch football goalkeeper

See also
 "Marleen" (Australian Playhouse), A 1966 Australian TV play 
 "Lili Marleen", a German song
 Marlene (given name)

References

Dutch feminine given names